Jósean Log, (born April 23, 1988, in Cholula, Puebla, Mexico), is a Singer-songwriter. He started his career on YouTube with an acoustic version of his most popular song Chachachá, a combination of folk, rock, son, bolero, and blues. His biggest influences are Manu Chao and Jorge Drexler and his music is defined as a "handsome pop", full of colors and nuances. He has been compared to singers like Caloncho, who also composes similar music.

Biography 
He studied at the Berklee College of Music.

Music and discography

EP Háblate de mí (2016) 
In 2016, he debuted with the album 'EP Háblate de mí', featuring the songs "Chachachá", "Beso", "Doma", "Tierra", and "La Luna". Chachachá reached more than 17 million views on YouTube and more than 10 million on Spotify.

EP Háblame de tú (2018) 
On January 26, 2018, he released his second EP album titled "Háblame de tú", containing the songs "La Vida La Vida", "Combustión", "No Quise'', "Contento de Contento".

EP El Futuro No Existe (2019) 
</ref></ref>

EP El Tiempo Locura Todo (2020) 
</ref></ref>

Notes and references

External links 
 

Male songwriters
Mexican songwriters
Mexican musicians
Living people
1988 births